Efimerida ton Syntakton is the name of a Greek cooperative daily newspaper.

History
The newspaper was first published in 2012 by former workers of the defunct Eleftherotypia. It supports political theses of the left and centre-left.

References

Publications established in 2012
2012 establishments in Greece
Newspapers published in Athens
Greek-language newspapers
Daily newspapers published in Greece